Barbara Gratton is a Canadian former figure skater who competed in ladies' singles. She is the 1953 North American bronze medalist and a two-time (1953 and 1954) Canadian national champion. She was a member of Toronto SC.

Results

References

Navigation

Living people
Canadian female single skaters
Year of birth missing (living people)